Madeleine Ashcraft Bates (born c. 1948) is a researcher in natural language processing who worked at BBN Technologies in Cambridge, Massachusetts from the early 1970s to the late 1990s. She was president of the Association for Computational Linguistics in 1985, and co-editor of the book Challenges in Natural Language Processing (1993).

Education and career
Bates was a student at Allegheny College before transferring to Carnegie Mellon University, where she majored in mathematics, graduating in 1968. She completed her Ph.D. in applied mathematics at Harvard University in 1975, working there with Bill Woods on augmented transition networks.

While a student at Harvard, she began working part-time at BBN in 1971. After completing her Ph.D., she was an assistant professor at Boston University for three years before becoming a full-time researcher at BBN.

Personal life
Bates married chemist Alan Hunt Bates in summer 1968; he later became a professor at the University of Massachusetts Dartmouth. Her mother, Madeleine DeMuth Ashcraft (died 1990), was a long-term sufferer of Huntington's disease, and Bates has been an activist for the treatment of Huntington's disease, serving as president of the Massachusetts Chapter of the committee to Combat Huntington's Disease.

Selected publications

References

Year of birth missing (living people)
Living people
American computer scientists
American women computer scientists
Computational linguistics researchers
Carnegie Mellon University alumni
Harvard University alumni
Boston University faculty